Ninh Hải may refer to:

 Ninh Hải District, a district in Ninh Thuận Province, Vietnam
 Ninh Hải, Ninh Hòa, a ward in Ninh Hòa, Khanh Hoa Province, Vietnam